Julius Kibiwott Melly is the member of the National Assembly of Kenya for Tinderet Constituency elected in the 2013 general election. He was the principal of Meteitei Boys Secondary School before joining politics. He is currently the chairman of Education Committee at the National Assembly of Kenya.

References

Kenyan politicians
Living people
Year of birth missing (living people)